This chart shows the trends in the partisan composition of the various state legislatures in the United States. In most cases the data point for each year is July 1, a time when few elections are scheduled. Most states hold legislative elections in the even numbered years, so the data points below are near the end of the term for most states. However, 2018 data is for the beginning of the year. Nebraska is not included in the national summaries below. Vacancies are not listed.

See also
 List of United States state legislatures
 Political party strength in U.S. states

References

Legislatures
c